Phenacodes is a genus of moths of the family Crambidae.

Species
Phenacodes aleuropa (Lower, 1903)
Phenacodes epipaschiodes (Hampson, 1912)
Phenacodes nigroalba (Rothschild, 1915)
Phenacodes nolalis (Hampson, 1899)
Phenacodes scopariodes (Hampson, 1912)
Phenacodes vegetata (T. P. Lucas, 1901)

References

Natural History Museum Lepidoptera genus database

Cybalomiinae
Crambidae genera
Taxa named by Alfred Jefferis Turner